Rinat Fayzrakhmanovich Dasayev (born 13 June 1957) is a Russian football coach and a former Soviet goalkeeper. 

Throughout his club career, he played for Volgar Astrakhan, Spartak Moscow, and Sevilla. At international level, he played in three World Cups with the Soviet national team, also winning a bronze medal at the 1980 Summer Olympics, and a runners-up medal at UEFA Euro 1988. 

Regarded as one of the best goalkeepers in the world during the 1980s, he is considered the second best Russian goalkeeper ever behind Lev Yashin. He was awarded the title of the World’s Best Goalkeeper of the Year award in 1988 by the IFFHS. In a 1999 poll by the same organisation, he was elected the sixteenth greatest European goalkeeper of the twentieth century, alongside Gianpiero Combi, and the seventeenth greatest goalkeeper of the century. In 2004, he was named by Pelé as one of the top 125 greatest living footballers.

Following his retirement, he worked as a coach, and currently serves as a goalkeeping consultant with FC Spartak-2 Moscow and Spartak's youth teams.

Club career
Dasayev played as a goalkeeper for the Russian football club Spartak Moscow during most of the 1980s. He won the Soviet championship in 1979 and 1987 and was named Best Soviet Goalkeeper by Ogonyok (Огонëк) magazine in 1980, 1982, 1983, 1985, 1987, 1988. In 1982, he was named Soviet Footballer of the Year. After his contract ran out with the Spanish club Sevilla FC in the early 1990s, Dasayev retired from the sport.

International career
Dasayev played for the Soviet national team at the 1980 Summer Olympics, winning the bronze medal. He appeared in the 1982, 1986 and 1990 FIFA World Cups, as well as the Euro 88, where the Soviet Union reached the final, only to lose out to the Netherlands. In total, he was capped 91 times from 1979 to 1990, being the second-most capped player ever for the Soviet Union.

Style of play
Nicknamed "The Iron Curtain" and "The Cat", Dasayev is considered to be one of the greatest goalkeepers of all time, and one of the best players in the world in his position during the 1980s; he is also regarded as the second-best Russian goalkeeper ever after Yashin. In addition to his shot-stopping abilities as a goalkeeper, Dasayev was also known for his trademark sudden long throws, which he would make immediately after stopping a shot, in order to start quick counter-attacks from the back; he was also known for his particular diving technique, which often saw him attempt saves with only one arm, in a similar manner to his Italian contemporary Franco Tancredi. A tall and well-rounded goalkeeper with a slender physique, he possessed an excellent positional sense, and often positioned himself in very deep positions, rarely straying from his goal-line, and preferring to remain between the posts throughout the course of a match. He was also known for his efficient, rather than spectacular, playing style, as well as his ability to organise his defence. Considered to be the goalkeeping heir of Lev Yashin in Soviet football, he often drew wide praise for his ability in the press. However, critical opinion of Dasayev was occasionally divided; Italian sports journalist Gianni Brera, for example, believed that he was overrated in the media.

After retirement 
Dasayev retired from professional football in the early 1990s, following his time with Sevilla. In 2001, he traveled to Vietnam to play a friendly matches between legend players of Spartak Moscow and Hanoi XI, which ended 3–3. He was appointed as the 2008 UEFA Champions League Final Ambassador. Dasayev was a member of Russia's committee that won the bid to hold the 2018 FIFA World Cup. Unlike most of other legends and football pundits in Russia following Russia's quarter-finals feat in 2018 World Cup, Dasayev criticized the Russian team and believed quarter-finals can't be considered as an achievement.

He had to retire from active coaching in late 2018 due to knee injuries and currently works as goalkeeping consultant with FC Spartak-2 Moscow and Spartak's youth teams.

Personal life

Rinat Dasayev is a Muslim.

Honours
Spartak Moscow
 Soviet Top League: 1979, 1987; runner-up: 1980, 1981, 1983, 1984, 1985
 Soviet Cup runner-up: 1981

Soviet Union
 UEFA European Football Championship runner-up: 1988

Individual
 Soviet Footballer of the Year: 1982
 Soviet Goalkeeper of the Year Award (5)
 IFFHS World's Best Goalkeeper: 1988
 Berlin-Britz Goalkeeper of the Decade (1980s): 1999
 Golden Foot Legends Award: 2015
 FIFA 100

References

External links
 Rinat Dasayev at goalkeepersaredifferent.com

1957 births
Living people
Volga Tatar people
Tatar sportspeople
Tatar people of Russia
Sportspeople from Astrakhan
1982 FIFA World Cup players
1986 FIFA World Cup players
1990 FIFA World Cup players
FC Spartak Moscow players
FC Torpedo Moscow managers
FC Spartak Moscow managers
FIFA 100
Association football goalkeepers
Footballers at the 1980 Summer Olympics
La Liga players
Olympic footballers of the Soviet Union
Olympic bronze medalists for the Soviet Union
Soviet expatriate sportspeople in Spain
Sevilla FC players
Soviet footballers
Soviet Union international footballers
Soviet expatriate footballers
Soviet Top League players
UEFA Euro 1988 players
Expatriate footballers in Spain
FC Volgar Astrakhan players
Olympic medalists in football
Medalists at the 1980 Summer Olympics
Russian footballers
Russian football managers
Russian Muslims
Association football goalkeeping coaches